Suia may refer to:
Suia (Crete), a town of ancient Crete, Greece
Suia-Miçu River, a river of Brazil
Suia Missu River, a river of Brazil